Streamlines, streaklines and pathlines are field lines in a fluid flow.
They differ only when the flow changes with time, that is, when the flow is not steady.

Considering a velocity vector field in three-dimensional space in the framework of continuum mechanics, we have that:  
 Streamlines are a family of curves whose tangent vectors constitute the velocity vector field of the flow. These show the direction in which a massless fluid element will travel at any point in time.
 Streaklines are the loci of points of all the fluid particles that have passed continuously through a particular spatial point in the past. Dye steadily injected into the fluid at a fixed point extends along a streakline.
 Pathlines are the trajectories that individual fluid particles follow.  These can be thought of as "recording"  the path of a fluid element in the flow over a certain period. The direction the path takes will be determined by the streamlines of the fluid at each moment in time.
 Timelines are the lines formed by a set of fluid particles that were marked at a previous instant in time, creating a line or a curve that is displaced in time as the particles move.

By definition, different streamlines at the same instant in a flow do not intersect, because a fluid particle cannot have two different velocities at the same point. However, pathlines are allowed to intersect themselves or other pathlines (except the starting and end points of the different pathlines, which need to be distinct). Streaklines can also intersect themselves and other streaklines.

Streamlines and timelines provide a snapshot of some flowfield characteristics, whereas streaklines and pathlines depend on the -history of the flow. However, often sequences of timelines (and streaklines) at different instants—being presented either in a single image or with a video stream—may be used to provide insight in the flow and its history.

If a line, curve or closed curve is used as start point for a continuous set of streamlines, the result is a stream surface. In the case of a closed curve in a steady flow, fluid that is inside a stream surface must remain forever within that same stream surface, because the streamlines are tangent to the flow velocity. A scalar function whose contour lines define the streamlines is known as the stream function.

Dye line may refer either to a streakline: dye released gradually from a fixed location during time; or it may refer to a timeline: a line of dye applied instantaneously at a certain moment in time, and observed at a later instant.

Mathematical description

Streamlines 

Streamlines are defined by

If the components of the velocity are written  and those of the streamline as  we deduce

which shows that the curves are parallel to the velocity vector. Here  is a variable which parametrizes the curve   Streamlines are calculated instantaneously, meaning that at one instance of time they are calculated throughout the fluid from the instantaneous flow velocity field.

A streamtube consists of a bundle of streamlines, much like communication cable.

The equation of motion of a fluid on a streamline for a flow in a vertical plane is:

For a steady flow, the time derivative of the velocity is zero: .  denotes the gravitational acceleration.

Pathlines 

Pathlines are defined by

The suffix  indicates that we are following the motion of a fluid particle. 
 
Note that at point  the curve is parallel to the flow velocity vector , where the velocity vector is evaluated at the position of the particle  at that time .

Streaklines 

Streaklines can be expressed as,

where,  is the velocity of a particle  at location  and time .

Steady flows 

In steady flow (when the velocity vector-field does not change with time), the streamlines, pathlines, and streaklines coincide.  This is because when a particle on a streamline reaches a point, further on that streamline the equations governing the flow will send it in a certain direction .  As the equations that govern the flow remain the same when another particle reaches   it will also go in the direction  . If the flow is not steady then when the next particle reaches position  the flow would have changed and the particle will go in a different direction.

This is useful, because it is usually very difficult to look at streamlines in an experiment. However, if the flow is steady, one can use streaklines to describe the streamline pattern.

Frame dependence 

Streamlines are frame-dependent.  That is, the streamlines observed in one inertial reference frame are different from those observed in another inertial reference frame. For instance, the streamlines in the air around an aircraft wing are defined differently for the passengers in the aircraft than for an observer on the ground. In the aircraft example, the observer on the ground will observe unsteady flow, and the observers in the aircraft will observe steady flow, with constant streamlines. When possible, fluid dynamicists try to find a reference frame in which the flow is steady, so that they can use experimental methods of creating streaklines to identify the streamlines.

Application 

Knowledge of the streamlines can be useful in fluid dynamics. The curvature of a streamline is related to the pressure gradient acting perpendicular to the streamline. The center of curvature of the streamline lies in the direction of decreasing radial pressure. The magnitude of the radial pressure gradient can be calculated directly from the density of the fluid, the curvature of the streamline and the local velocity.

Dye can be used in water, or smoke in air, in order to see streaklines, from which pathlines can be calculated. Streaklines are identical to streamlines for steady flow. Further, dye can be used to create timelines. The patterns guide design modifications, aiming to reduce the drag. This task is known as streamlining, and the resulting design is referred to as being streamlined. Streamlined objects and organisms, like airfoils, streamliners, cars and dolphins are often aesthetically pleasing to the eye. The Streamline Moderne style, a 1930s and 1940s offshoot of Art Deco, brought flowing lines to architecture and design of the era. The canonical example of a streamlined shape is a chicken egg with the blunt end facing forwards. This shows clearly that the curvature of the front surface can be much steeper than the back of the object. Most drag is caused by eddies in the fluid behind the moving object, and the objective should be to allow the fluid to slow down after passing around the object, and regain pressure, without forming eddies.

The same terms have since become common vernacular to describe any process that smooths an operation. For instance, it is common to hear references to streamlining a business practice, or operation.

See also 

 Drag coefficient
 Elementary flow
 Equipotential surface
 Flow visualization
 Flow velocity
 Scientific visualization
 Seeding (fluid dynamics)
 Stream function
 Streamsurface
 Streamlet (scientific visualization)

Notes and references

Notes

References

External links 
Streamline illustration
 Tutorial - Illustration of Streamlines, Streaklines and Pathlines of a Velocity Field(with applet)
 Joukowsky Transform Interactive WebApp

Continuum mechanics
Numerical function drawing